Makran Coastal Range is a mountain range in the Makran region, in southwestern section of Balochistan Province, in southwestern Pakistan. It is one of three ranges in the mountain ranges system.

Geology
The Makran Coastal Range is primarily made up of limestone and sandstone. It was formed when the northwestern Indian plate collided with the Asian plate.

Adjacent ranges

There are three main ranges in Balochistan: 
the Makran Coastal Range (up to about ); 
the Central Makran Range; 
the Siahan Range.

See also
 Chabahar
 Gwadar
 Khor Kalmat
 Lyari Town
 Makran Coastal Highway
 Makran Coastal Range
 Makran Division
 N'aschi
 Sokhta Koh
 State of Makran
 Wildlife of Western Pakistan
 1945 Balochistan earthquake

References

External links
 NASA Images: Makran Ranges

Gwadar District
Mountain ranges of Balochistan (Pakistan)